Shark fin or Shark Fin may refer to:

The fins of a shark
Shark fin soup, a soup made with shark fins
Shark fin medicinals as quackery
Shark Fin, a peak in Antarctica
Shark Fin Glacier, a glacier near the Antarctic peak

See also
Shark finning